Euphaedra albofasciata is a butterfly in the family Nymphalidae. It is found in the Democratic Republic of the Congo, Central African Republic and Uganda: (Semuliki National Park).

References

Butterflies described in 1981
albofasciata